Aliabad (also Romanized as ‘Alīābād; also known as ‘Alīābād-e Bālā and ‘Alīābād-e ‘Olyā) is a village in Vahdat Rural District, in the Central District of Zarand County, Kerman Province, Iran. At the 2006 census, its population was 1,407, in 308 families.

References 

Populated places in Zarand County